Jonathan Carlsson (born August 5, 1988) is a Swedish ice hockey defenceman. He is currently playing with Timrå IK in the HockeyAllsvenskan. Carlsson was selected by the Chicago Blackhawks in the sixth round of the 2008 NHL Entry Draft.

Playing career
For the beginning of the 2010–11 season, Carlsson was assigned to the Rockford IceHogs in the American Hockey League.

Carlsson spent the 2014–15 season, with Södertälje SK in the Allsvenskan before opting to return to North America in agreeing to a one-year ECHL contract with the Evansville IceMen on September 8, 2015.

In the 2016–17 season, his second successive year spent within the Chicago Blackhawks affiliates in the AHL and ECHL, Carlsson was released by the Rockford IceHogs on February 11, 2017, after securing a contract for the remainder of the campaign in Slovakia with HC ’05 Banská Bystrica.

Career statistics

Regular season and playoffs

International

References

External links

1988 births
HC '05 Banská Bystrica players
IF Björklöven players
Brynäs IF players
Chicago Blackhawks draft picks
Evansville IceMen players
Graz 99ers players
Indy Fuel players
Living people
Mora IK players
Rockford IceHogs (AHL) players
Södertälje SK players
Swedish ice hockey defencemen
Swedish expatriate ice hockey players in the United States
Timrå IK players
Toledo Walleye players
HC TWK Innsbruck players
Sportspeople from Uppsala
Swedish expatriate sportspeople in Austria
Swedish expatriate sportspeople in Slovakia
Expatriate ice hockey players in Austria
Expatriate ice hockey players in Slovakia